Baba Tonka Cove is the 1.1 km wide cove indenting for 750 m the north coast of Byers Peninsula between Villard Point and Varadero Point on Livingston Island in the South Shetland Islands, Antarctica.  The area was visited by early 19th century sealers.

The cove is named after the Bulgarian revolutionary and national hero Tonka Obretenova (1812–1893), known as Baba Tonka ("Grandma Tonka").

Location
British mapping in 1968, Spanish in 1993 and Bulgarian in 2009.

Map
 L.L. Ivanov. Antarctica: Livingston Island and Greenwich, Robert, Snow and Smith Islands. Scale 1:120000 topographic map.  Troyan: Manfred Wörner Foundation, 2009.

References
 Baba Tonka Cove. SCAR Composite Gazetteer of Antarctica.
 Bulgarian Antarctic Gazetteer. Antarctic Place-names Commission. (details in Bulgarian, basic data in English)

External links
 Baba Tonka Cove. Copernix satellite image

Coves of Livingston Island
Bulgaria and the Antarctic